The 1966 West Virginia Mountaineers football team represented West Virginia University in the 1966 NCAA University Division football season. It was the Mountaineers' 74th overall season and they competed as a member of the Southern Conference (SoCon). The team was led by head coach Jim Carlen, in his first year, and played their home games at Mountaineer Field in Morgantown, West Virginia. They finished the season with a record of three wins, five losses and two ties (3–5–2 overall, 3–0 SoCon).

Schedule

References

West Virginia
West Virginia Mountaineers football seasons
West Virginia Mountaineers football